Charlotte Lucie Marie Adèle Stephanie Adrienne Faës (20 March 1865 – 14 October 1956), known by her stage name Jeanne d'Alcy or Jehanne d'Alcy, was a French film actress.

Biography 
D'Alcy had achieved success in theatrical productions by 1896, but left the stage to devote herself to film, becoming one of the first performers to do so.

Born in Vaujours, Seine-Saint-Denis, she appeared in Le Manoir du diable (1896), Jeanne d'Arc (1900) and Le Voyage dans la lune (1902). She died in Versailles at age 91. She was portrayed by actress Helen McCrory in Martin Scorsese's 2011 film Hugo.

She was the wife of French cinema pioneer Georges Méliès from 1925 until his death in 1938. D'Alcy died at the age of 91 in 1956. She is buried with her husband in the Père-Lachaise cemetery.

Selected filmography
Le Manoir du diable (1896)
Escamotage d'une dame au théâtre Robert Houdin (1896) – Woman
Après le bal (1897) – Woman
Jeanne d'Arc (1899)
Cendrillon (1899) – Fairy Godmother
Cléopâtre (1899) – Cleopatre
Barbe-bleue (1901) – Le nouvelle épouse de Barbe-bleue
Le Voyage dans la lune (1902) (uncredited)
Le Grand Méliès (1952) – herself

Bibliography

References

External links

 
 

1865 births
1956 deaths
French stage actresses
French film actresses
French silent film actresses
People from Seine-Saint-Denis
20th-century French actresses
19th-century French actresses
Burials at Père Lachaise Cemetery
Muses